Von Ebner's glands, also called Ebner's glands or gustatory glands, are exocrine glands found in the mouth. More specifically, they are serous salivary glands which reside adjacent to the moats surrounding the circumvallate and foliate papillae just anterior to the posterior third of the tongue, anterior to the terminal sulcus.

These glands are named after Victor von Ebner, an Austrian histologist.

Von Ebner's glands secrete lingual lipase, beginning the process of lipid hydrolysis in the mouth.  These glands empty their serous secretion into the base of the moats around the foliate and circumvallate papillae.  This secretion presumably flushes material from the mouth to enable the taste buds to respond rapidly to changing stimuli.

Von Ebner's glands are innervated by cranial nerve IX, the glossopharyngeal nerve.

References

External links
 Anton Gilbert Viktor Ebner, Ritter von Rofenstein entry @ whonamedit.com
 
 
 
 
 Dental histology at University of Southern California

Glands of mouth